Redcliff Point is on the south coast of England, to the east of Weymouth in Dorset. It lies just past the eastern end of the sweeping Weymouth Bay on the Jurassic Coast, a UNESCO World Heritage landscape known for its geology. Fossils can be found in the Upper Oxford Clay in this area.

The cliff looks over to the Isle of Portland. It is so-called because of the red colouring of the cliffs at this point.

Close by to the west are the Broadrock cliffs and Bowleaze Cove. To the east are Black Head and the coastal village of Osmington Mills.

See also 
 Bran Point, known for its brown cliffs
 White Nothe, known for its white chalk cliffs

References 

Headlands of Dorset
Jurassic Coast